Li Weijun (born 1 February 1981 in China) is a former professional Chinese football goalkeeper.

Club career

He would move on a free transfer to second tier Chinese football club Guangdong Sunray Cave where he remained for four seasons before joining third-tier club Meizhou Kejia where he was part of the team that won the division championship. After helping guide the club to safety within the division the following season Li decided to retire from football.
He would move on a free transfer to second tier Chinese football club Guangdong Sunray Cave where he remained for four seasons before joining third-tier club Meizhou Kejia where he was part of the team that won the division championship. After helping guide the club to safety within the division the following season Li decided to retire from football.

Career statistics

Honours
Meizhou Kejia
China League Two: 2015

References

External links
 SouthChinaFC.com, 1. 李偉軍 

1981 births
Living people
People from Wuhua
Chinese footballers
Association football goalkeepers
Hong Kong First Division League players
South China AA players
China League One players
Anhui Jiufang players
Guangdong Sunray Cave players
Meizhou Hakka F.C. players
Meizhou Hakka F.C. managers
Hakka sportspeople
Footballers from Meizhou
Chinese football managers